Koh Ta Kiev (“Ancestor Kiev’s Island” –  named "Ile de la Baie" during the French colonial period) is the biggest of a small group of Cambodian islands situated 4 km off Otres beach, Sihanoukville City and just 1 km off the coast of Ream National Park, Sihanoukville Province.

 There is also a small fishing village on the East side of the island. Apart from the Cambodian Navy, which maintains a small base with a port, no infrastructure exists.

Three beaches attract travelers and tourists. After many years of attracting individual visitors, large scale resort development is planned. There are currently a few guesthouses and a campsite for visitors to stay.

The island is accessible by ferry or speedboat from Ream beach, not far from Sihanoukville airport.

See also 
 Koh Seh
 Koh Russei
 Ream National Park
 List of islands of Cambodia
 Sihanoukville (city)

References

Sihanoukville (city)
Populated places in Sihanoukville province
Islands of Cambodia
Islands of the Gulf of Thailand